Milano Bruzzano is a surface railway station in the Bruzzano district in Milan, Italy.

The line was opened in 1879 as part of the Milan–Asso railway, and is now managed by Ferrovienord. It is the last station in Milan municipality on this line. The station is in the Parco Nord (Northern Park) of Milan.

Services
Milano Bruzzano is served by lines S2 and S4 of the Milan suburban railway service, operated by the Lombard railway company Trenord.

Old station

The old Bruzzano station, built in 1879 as part of the original line, was located to the south of the current station.

See also
Railway stations in Milan
Milan suburban railway service

References

Bruzzano
Ferrovienord stations
Railway stations opened in 2014
Milan S Lines stations
1879 establishments in Italy
Railway stations in Italy opened in the 19th century